Jordan Pruitt Fuente (née Jordan Lynne Pruitt; born May 19, 1991) is an American former singer-songwriter living in Nashville, Tennessee. After recording a demo EP in 2005, Pruitt was consequently signed to Hollywood Records at age 12. She went on to tour with the likes of numerous other artists including Drake Bell, Demi Lovato, The Jonas Brothers, High School Musical, The Cheetah Girls, and Plain White T's. She is currently in the process of writing her first book, AA: Abused Anonymous, a 12-step self-help book for those who have experienced abuse, and is hoping to publish the book soon. Jordan and her husband Brian Fuente own The Aero Bar and Aero Build based in Nashville, TN.

Pruitt has released two albums, the debut, No Ordinary Girl (2007), followed by a second, Permission to Fly (2008). Her debut single, "Outside Looking In", charted on the US Billboard 100 at number 77.

Early life
Pruitt was born and raised in Loganville, Georgia. She went to school at Covenant Christian Academy. She started writing songs at age nine. In 2005, she recorded a demo album that was eventually discovered. Shortly after, Pruitt was signed to Hollywood Records.

Career

2006–2012: Career beginnings, label changes 
In June 2006, Pruitt's debut single, "Outside Looking In", was released to promote the Disney Channel TV film Read It and Weep. Her debut studio album, No Ordinary Girl, was released on February 6, 2007, and peaked at number 64 on the US Billboard 200 chart in the United States.

On selected dates, Pruitt toured as the opening act of The Cheetah Girls during their 2006 tour. She also took part in all tour dates of the High School Musical: The Concert in 2006 and 2007. Pruitt was featured on the main theme song for the 2007 Disney film Jump In!, titled "Jump to the Rhythm". In 2009, Pruitt also toured with Demi Lovato on the Demi Lovato: Live In Concert tour.

Pruitt's second studio album, Permission to Fly, was released on July 22, 2008.

Pruitt also recorded the song "Take to the Sky" for the soundtrack of the film Tinker Bell and the Lost Treasure. Her cover of "This Christmas" appeared in the compilation album All Wrapped Up Vol. 2.

In February 2011, it was confirmed that Pruitt was no longer under contract with Hollywood Records but was signed to Jonas Records. Pruitt premiered her song "Shy Boy" on March 1 via Facebook and YouTube. It was later confirmed the version of "Shy Boy" released on March 1 was a demo version, and it was only released for promotional use; however, a real version of the song would be on her upcoming album.  In April 2011, another new song entitled "What a Feeling" was leaked. It was expected to be on her new album. On July 5, Pruitt posted a preview of a new song, "Something's Gotta Give", on her YouTube account.

On September 2, 2012, Pruitt announced on her official website, and at the beginning of a video of her performing "My Love Is Like a Star" by Demi Lovato, that she would be offering seven unreleased songs, one song a day for a week, accompanied with a music video. 

On October 12, 2012, Pruitt made a YouTube video titled "R.I.P Amanda Todd", after finding out that Amanda Todd's last YouTube video was of her singing Pruitt's song "Outside Looking In" before she had committed suicide. Pruitt went on to say she hoped people would fight to stop bullying and cyber-bullying and that her thoughts and prayers were with Todd's family.

2012–2017: The Voice and retirement
On August 3, 2012, Pruitt announced on her official Facebook page that she auditioned for the third season of the American singing television competition The Voice. Her blind audition aired on NBC on September 24, 2012. She sang "The One That Got Away" by Katy Perry. Christina Aguilera was the only one of the four coaches to turn around, and Pruitt became part of Team Christina by default. Pruitt's battle competition against Adriana Louise was aired on October 23, 2012, in which the two singers took part in singing "Hot n Cold" by Perry. Aguilera ruled Louise the winner, eliminating Pruitt from the competition. Following Pruitt's elimination from The Voice, she tweeted to fans to say that she was taking on the country genre.

On December 1, 2017, Pruitt announced that she was retiring from music. Since 2017, she has been a co-owner of The Aero Bar alongside her husband, Brian Fuente.

Personal life
Pruitt is a Christian.

In May 2014, Pruitt became engaged to fellow The Voice alum Brian Fuente. The two were married on May 24, 2015. She and her husband currently own The Aero Bar and AeroBuild in Nashville, TN. In September 2020, she gave birth to their first child.

Discography

Albums

Singles

Tours

Opening act 

 The Cheetah Girls – The Party's Just Begun Tour (2006)
 High School Musical cast – High School Musical: The Concert (2006-2007)
 Jonas Brothers – Six Flags-State Fair Tour (2007) 
 Drake Bell and Corbin Bleu – State Fair Tour (2007)
 Simon D Mall Tour (2007)
 Family Channel Spring Break Kickin' It (2007)
 The Plain White Tees (2007)
 Corbin Bleu and Vanessa Hudgens (2007) 
 Canada's Wonderland (2008)
 Raven-Symoné Live Tour! (2008-2009)
 Demi Lovato – Demi Lovato: Live In Concert (2009)

Co-headlining 

 The Tour of Gymnastics Superstars (2008) (with KSM and Carly Patterson)
 Max Schneider and Jordan Pruitt Summer Tour (2013) (with Max Schneider)

References

External links

 
 
 

1991 births
Living people
American Christians
American child singers
21st-century American singers
American women pop singers
Child pop musicians
Hollywood Records artists
The Voice (franchise) contestants
Singers from Georgia (U.S. state)
People from Loganville, Georgia
Songwriters from Georgia (U.S. state)
21st-century American women singers